San Germano Chisone (French: Saint-Germain) is a comune (municipality) in the Metropolitan City of Turin in the Italian region Piedmont, located about  southwest of Turin.  
San Germano Chisone borders the following municipalities: Inverso Pinasca, Villar Perosa, Pramollo, Porte, Angrogna, San Secondo di Pinerolo, and Prarostino.

References

Cities and towns in Piedmont